Côte d'Ivoire participated at the 2010 Summer Youth Olympics in Singapore.

Athletics

Boys
Track and road events

Basketball

Girls

Taekwondo

References

External links
Competitors List: Côte d'Ivoire

2010 in Ivorian sport
Nations at the 2010 Summer Youth Olympics
Youth Olympics 2010
Ivory Coast at the Youth Olympics